Stargate SG-1 is an American-Canadian military science fiction television series and part of MGM's Stargate franchise. The show was created by Brad Wright and Jonathan Glassner, based on the 1994 feature film Stargate by Dean Devlin and Roland Emmerich. The first five seasons of the television series were broadcast by Showtime before the series moved to the Sci Fi Channel for its last five seasons. Stargate SG-1 premiered on Showtime on July 27, 1997; its final episode aired on Sky1 in the United Kingdom on March 13, 2007. Stargate SG-1 was nominated for and won numerous awards in its ten-season run.

CableACE Awards
Stargate SG-1 was nominated for one CableACE Award.

Constellation Awards
Stargate SG-1 won two Constellation Awards.Emmy AwardStargate SG-1 was nominated for eight Emmys in the "Outstanding Special Visual Effects for a Series" category and one Emmy for "Outstanding Music Composition for a Series (Dramatic Underscore)".

Gemini AwardStargate SG-1 won two Gemini Awards out of 28 nominations.

Golden Reel AwardsStargate SG-1 was nominated for 2 Golden Reel Awards by the Motion Picture Sound Editors.

Hugo AwardsStargate SG-1 was nominated for 2 Hugo awards.

Leo AwardsStargate SG-1 won twelve Leo Awards out of 53 nominations.

Saturn AwardsStargate SG-1 won six Saturn Awards out of thirty nominations:

SFX AwardsStargate SG-1 was nominated for three SFX Awards.

Visual Effects Society AwardsStargate SG-1'' was nominated for two VES Awards.

See also
List of Stargate Atlantis awards and nominations
List of Stargate Universe awards and nominations

References

External links
 Awards for Stargate SG-1 at IMDB

Stargate
Stargate